Sir Thomas Butler, 6th Baronet (1735 – 7 October 1772) was an Irish politician and baronet.

He was the eldest son of Sir Richard Butler, 5th Baronet and his wife Henrietta Percy, daughter of Henry Percy. Butler sat for Carlow County in the Irish House of Commons from 1761 to 1768, the same constituency several members of his family had represented before. In 1771, Butler stood as Member of Parliament (MP) for Portarlington and also succeeded his father as baronet, however died only a year later.

Marriage and children
On 19 June 1759, Butler married Dorothea Bayly, only daughter of Very Rev. Edward Bayly, Archdeacon of Dublin. They had four daughters and four sons. His oldest son Richard succeeded to the baronetcy.

References

1735 births
1772 deaths
Irish MPs 1761–1768
Irish MPs 1769–1776
Politicians from County Carlow
People educated at Kilkenny College
Thomas
Butler baronets, of Cloughgrenan
Members of the Parliament of Ireland (pre-1801) for County Carlow constituencies
Members of the Parliament of Ireland (pre-1801) for Portarlington